Jan Schaffrath (born March 16, 1971, in Berlin) is a German directeur sportif for UCI ProTeam Omega Pharma–Quick-Step and former professional road bicycle racer. Before turning professional he was twice military World Champion.  At the 1994 UCI Road World Championships he won the bronze medal in the men's team time trail. He raced as a professional from 1997 until 2005, all the time at T-Mobile Team. At the end of 2005 he retired and moved to Team Milram as a directeur sportif, but only lasted one season there before returning to T-Mobile as a directeur sportif, which later changed its name to Team High Road and Team Columbia. After HTC did not find a new sponsor, he moved to the Belgian team Omega Pharma–Quick-Step.

References

External links 

German male cyclists
Cyclists from Berlin
1971 births
Living people
Directeur sportifs